Silver Star is a  steel roller coaster located at Europa-Park, a theme park in Rust, Germany. At the time of its opening, Silver Star was one of Bolliger & Mabillard (B&M)'s tallest coasters constructed; in 2012, they surpassed themselves with Shambhala: Expedición al Himalaya, at Barcelona’s PortAventura Park, with a height of 76m/249’. B&M would then go on to further beat their own records, with the 93m/306’ tall Leviathan (at Canada's Wonderland), and the aptly-named, 325’ high Fury 325 (at North Carolina’s Carowinds) in 2015. These two became the tallest coasters B&M has ever built, to date. 

Silver Star has 3 trains, which seat 36 people each, giving an hourly capacity of 1,750 passengers. This hypercoaster is situated in the “France” area of Europa Park, and is sponsored by Mercedes-Benz. A YouTube video titled "Silver Star off-ride HD Europa Park", by the channel CoasterForce, has over 162 million views.

The ride
Silver Star features no inversions, but many camelback hills:

 After the first drop, the train travels to the left and up onto the first camelback, before making a smaller drop, and then a second camelback.
 The train performs a 180° return in the horseshoe element.
 The train then continues onto another camelback before a mid-course brake-run.
 A 270° upwards turn brings the train back under the lift hill, and onto one last camelback.
 An S-bend (“bunny-hops”) has the train passing by the camera for candid on-ride photos, before the final brake run.

Nearly every camelback is fitted with brake trims to regulate the trains’ speed. The original friction-brake trims made the ride uncomfortable for some riders; these were refitted with magnetic trims.

Gallery

References

Roller coasters in Germany
Roller coasters introduced in 2002
Rides at Europa-Park
2002 establishments in Germany
Hypercoasters manufactured by Bolliger & Mabillard